James Duggan (born 1930) was an Irish hurler who played as a right wing-forward for the Galway senior team.

Born in College Road, Galway, Duggan first played competitive hurling whilst at school at St. Patrick's College. He arrived on the inter-county scene when he first linked up with the Galway minor team, before later joining the junior side. He joined senior panel for the 1950-51 National Hurling League. Duggan went on to play a key role for Galway for over fifteen years, however, he enjoyed little success in terms of silverware. He was an All-Ireland runner-up on three occasions.

As a member of the Connacht inter-provincial team at various times throughout his career, Duggan enjoyed little success in the Railway Cup. At club level he was a four-time championship medallist with Liam Mellows.

Throughout his career Cullinane made 17 championship appearances for Galway. His retirement came following the conclusion of the 1967 championship.

His brothers, Seánie and Paddy, all played with distinction for Galway, while their sister, Monica, was a renowned camogie player.

In retirement from playing Duggan became a referee at club, inter-county and inter-provincial levels.

Honours

Player

Liam Mellows
Galway Senior Club Hurling Championship (4): 1954, 1955, 1968, 1970

Galway
National Hurling League (1): 1950-51 (sub)

References

1930 births
Living people
Liam Mellows hurlers
Galway City hurlers
Galway inter-county hurlers
Connacht inter-provincial hurlers
Hurling referees